Live at Montreal International Jazz Festival is a live album recorded for the Italian Black Saint label by the improvisational collective New Air featuring Henry Threadgill, Fred Hopkins and Pheeroan akLaff performing at the Montreal International Jazz Festival in 1983. The album was the first release to feature akLaff who replaced original Air drummer Steve McCall.

Reception
The Allmusic review by Ron Wynn awarded the album 2½ stars, stating, "Hopkins didn't mesh as smoothly with akLaff on this date, although they found a comfortable meeting place by mid-album. Henry Threadgill, as always, was a compelling soloist, especially on alto sax".

Track listing
All compositions by Henry Threadgill
 "Sir Simpleton" - 11:02
 "Difda Dance" - 12:53
 "Roll On" - 4:56
 "Tragedy On a Thursday Afternoon" - 8:32
 "No. 1" - 9:09 
Recorded live July, 1983, at Montreal International Jazz Festival

Personnel
Henry Threadgill - alto saxophone, flute, baritone saxophone
Fred Hopkins - bass
Pheeroan akLaff - percussion

References

Air (free jazz trio) live albums
1984 live albums
Black Saint/Soul Note live albums